World's Weirdest Restaurants is a Canadian reality television series produced by Paperny Entertainment that airs on Food Network Canada. The series follows host Bob Blumer as he travels the world searching for weird and unusual restaurants. Several of the Japan episodes featured TV host and arranger La Carmina, who wrote a book about bizarre Tokyo theme restaurants. Among the restaurants featured include a nudist restaurant in New York, a Japanese restaurant with monkey waiters, and Taiwanese restaurant which serves curry from miniature toilets. The series, which premiered April 4, 2012, has filmed in a number of cities around the world, including Tokyo, New York, Taipei, London and Vancouver.

References

External links
 
 

Food Network (Canadian TV channel) original programming
2012 Canadian television series debuts
Food reality television series
2010s Canadian reality television series
Television series by Entertainment One
2013 Canadian television series endings